Jalen Catalon (born March 15, 2001) is an American football safety who plays for the Texas Longhorns.

Early life and high school
Catalon grew up in Mansfield, Texas and attended Mansfield Legacy High School, where he played baseball, basketball, and football. As a sophomore, he recorded 183 total tackles with seven tackles for loss and nine interceptions. Catalon was named the All-Area Defensive Player of the Year by The Dallas Morning News as a junior after recording 101 tackles, three interceptions, six forced fumbles and five fumble recoveries. He also started at quarterback and passed for 1,122 yards and 15 touchdowns with 1,064 yards and 13 touchdowns rushing ad Mansfield Legacy advanced to the 5A Division II state semifinals. Catalon suffered a season-ending knee injury in the first game of his senior season. Catalon was rated a four-star recruit and committed to play college football at Arkansas over offers from Oklahoma, TCU and Texas.

College career
Catalon redshirted his true freshman season at Arkansas after appearing in four games. He became a starter going into his redshirt freshman season and recorded 99 tackles, 3 interceptions, 2 forced fumbles and 7 pass breakups and was named first team All-Southeastern Conference (SEC) by the Associated Press and a freshman All-American by the Football Writers Association of America.

References

External links
Arkansas Razorbacks bio

2001 births
Living people
Arkansas Razorbacks football players
Players of American football from Texas
American football safeties
People from Mansfield, Texas